Jahangir Mirza was a Dughlat prince.

Jahangir Mirza may also refer to:

Jahangir Mirza (cricketer)
Jahangir Mirza (Timurid Prince)
 Jahangir Mirza II